T Kira Madden is an American writer. She is the author of a memoir, Long Live the Tribe of Fatherless Girls, and the Founding Editor-in-Chief of No Tokens Journal. In 2021, she received Lambda Literary's Judith A. Markowitz Award for Exceptional New LGBTQ Writers.

Personal life 
T Kira Madden grew up in Boca Raton, Florida. She is the niece of American fashion designer Steve Madden.

Madden has described herself "as a full-fucking-blown 50-footer lesbian". Of the queer material in her memoir, she has said, "I always knew I was gay, but I didn’t understand the knowing, and that feels really true to me...As much as I wanted to front load the book with queer material, this feels truer to how I lived it. It was always present and by my side but it was operating in a different plane."

Madden's father was Jewish and her mother is Chinese and Hawaiian. Of her multiracial upbringing, she has said:"My mother, as a Chinese Hawaiian woman, was raised in a Mormon household with Buddhist grandparents. And my father is of course Jewish from Long Island. They always let me learn about every different religion, every culture. I went to temple, I went to church, we did Chinese New Year’s — we did everything. They told me: Wherever you find your place, that’s your place. We’re not gonna tell you where you belong.

So that mix — which was confusing at the time — is something that was really part of my becoming [by] learning about all those different components of my identity."Madden has a BA in design and literature from Parsons School of Design and Eugene Lang College. She also holds an MFA in creative writing from Sarah Lawrence College. She facilitates writing workshops for homeless and formerly incarcerated individuals and currently teaches at College Of Charleston.

Madden is also a photographer and an amateur magician.

Long Live the Tribe of Fatherless Girls 
At a writers' residency after the death of her father, Madden intended to work on a novel. Instead, she found herself writing nonfiction, which turned into her memoir.

Long Live the Tribe of Fatherless Girls was published in March 2019 from Bloomsbury. In Literary Hub, Madden describes it as "a coming-of-age memoir growing up in Boca Raton, Florida, in a very privileged Jewish community as a biracial, queer girl with a lot of family secrets: two addict parents and a famous family, as well."

In The New York Times, Tessa Fontaine said of Long Live the Tribe of Fatherless Girls, "This is a fearless debut that carries as much tenderness as pain. The author never shrinks from putting herself back into the world after every hurt, and we are lucky for it...it’s all compulsively readable, not just because of those big themes, but because of the embodied, needle-fine moments that make the stories sing."

Electric Literature said, "What makes Long Live the Tribe of Fatherless Girls so exceptional is the compassion Madden brings to the page."

In NPR, Ilana Masad said, "In baring the bad and ugly alongside the good, Madden has succeeded in creating a mirror of larger concerns, even as her own story is achingly specific and personal."

Kirkus Reviews said, "Though the author’s aching emotional rawness sometimes makes for difficult reading, this is a deeply courageous work that chronicles one artist’s jagged—and surprisingly beautiful—path to wholeness. Affecting, fearless, and unsparingly honest."

When asked what she wants others to take away from the book, Madden has said, "I hope people feel the power of being an outsider."

No Tokens Journal 
Madden is the founding Editor-in-Chief of No Tokens Journal, which describes itself as "a journal celebrating work that is felt in the spine." They are run entirely by women and non-binary individuals.

Madden has said that No Tokens was founded because "there was and is a need for more balance in publishing. There is a need for people to start paying attention, and I’m glad so many are. I admired what VIDA was doing; I admired many journals and publishers who said, 'We’re here. Look.' It is unacceptable to ignore the numbers, and I wanted to be a part of that response."

On editing, she's said "Being an editor sharpens the eye and ear, yada yada, of course, but really, if we’re talking artistic development, founding and editing a journal has taught me everything about generosity and community building. The longer I’m here, the more I believe those qualities matter as much as craft."

References 

American lesbian writers
Living people
21st-century American women writers
Jewish American writers
LGBT Jews
Parsons School of Design alumni
Sarah Lawrence College alumni
1988 births